The Radunia is a hill in the Ślęża Masiff. Its height is 573 metres above sea level. It lies in Góra Radunia Nature Reserve.

The hill is situated in Dzierżoniów County, Lower Silesian Voivodeship, in south-western Poland.

External links
 sudety.it 
 przewodnik.onet.pl 

Mountains of Poland